Belle Creek may refer to:

Belle Creek (Cannon River), a stream in Minnesota
Belle Creek (Crow River), a stream in Minnesota
Belle Creek Township, Goodhue County, Minnesota
Belle Creek, Minnesota, an unincorporated community
Belle Creek, Montana, an unincorporated community